The Kia Seltos is a subcompact crossover SUV manufactured by Kia. Introduced in mid-2019, the Seltos is positioned between the smaller Stonic, Soul, or Sonet and the larger Sportage in Kia's global SUV lineup.

The Seltos is designated as a global product with three variations introduced for different markets. The first variation is the largest version of the Seltos, which is manufactured in South Korea (codename: SP2) mainly aimed for developed markets, including North America and Australasia. The two other variations are the Indian-made Seltos (codename: SP2i) and the closely related Chinese version badged as the Kia KX3 (codename: SP2c). The SP2i and SP2c models are the low-cost versions of the Seltos to penetrate emerging markets, built on the Hyundai-Kia K2 platform and closely related to the second-generation Hyundai Creta/ix25. Despite being a globally marketed model, the Seltos is not sold in the European market.

The name "Seltos" is derived from "Celtos", the son of Hercules and Celtine in Greek mythology. According to Kia, the Seltos is aimed directly at millennials and "youthful, tech-savvy buyers" looking for a vehicle that stands out from the crowd.

Overview
The Seltos started as two concept cars, the SP Concept, which was showcased at the 2018 Auto Expo in February 2018, and the SP Signature showcased at the 2019 Seoul Motor Show in March 2019. Both concept cars have a close resemblance with the current mass-production versions. The SP Concept previewed the SP2i Seltos built in India, while the SP Signature is the concept version of the South Korean-made SP2 Seltos.

The Seltos was launched in South Korea on 18 July 2019, India on 22 August 2019, and the Philippines on 6 November 2019 with a release in various global markets except Europe by the end of the year. The Seltos was also launched in Indonesia on 20 January 2020. The Seltos was launched in the United States, Canada, and Mexico in early 2020 for the 2021 model year. It was also introduced in Russia in June 2020.

Kia Motors Europe COO Emilio Herrera has confirmed the automaker would not sell the new Seltos in Europe due to the popularity of larger SUV offerings such as the Sportage and Sorento, and the release of the Stonic and XCeed in the small SUV segment.

In 2020 and 2021, the Seltos was the second best-selling Kia model globally after the Sportage, with India as its largest single market.

SP2 model 
SP2 is the internal codename designated to the version manufactured in South Korea, which is also assembled by knock-down kits in Russia and Uzbekistan. The SP2 Seltos is built on a platform shared with the Hyundai Kona and the Kia Soul.

Facelift

South Korea 
The SP2 Seltos debuted in South Korea on 18 July 2019. Both engines are equipped with a seven-speed dual-clutch transmission. It is also available with an all-wheel drive option.

Several driver-assist functions including forward collision-avoidance assist, lane-following assist, lane-keeping assist, driver-attention warning, and high-beam assist are available as standard for all trims.

The updated model was first unveiled in July 2022. The refreshed model features redesigned front clip, rear tailgate assembly, and other revisions. The dashboard design was revised with a single display that houses a 10.25-inch cluster and a 10.25-inch infotainment system screen, and a shift-by-wire gear lever design.

North America
Launched for the 2021 model year, the Seltos for the U.S. and Canada is positioned between the Soul and Sportage. It has a redesigned front bumper to maximize the front approach angle. Trim levels for the 2021 Seltos are LX, S, S Turbo, EX, and SX Turbo.

Standard on the Seltos SX and optional on the S, the 1.6 Turbo comes with a seven-speed dual-clutch automatic transmission. All-wheel drive is available and standard on most trims except for the S model, where it is optional and has similar mechanical components as the larger Telluride.

For the 2022 model year, the Seltos received a new Kia badge with the updated Kia logo and a Nightfall Edition trim that replaced the Turbo S model.

In Mexico, the SP2 Seltos is not offered, as the Indian-sourced SP2i Seltos is sold in the country instead.

Australia
The Seltos launched in October 2019 in the Australian market. The five grades consist of S, Sport, Sport+, Sport+ AWD, and GT-Line. Engine choice for lower end variants consist of the Nu 2.0-litre petrol engine mated to CVT, while higher end AWD models are powered by the 1.6-litre Gamma T-GDi engine with a seven-speed DCT. It is equipped with a region-specific suspension tuning to suit the road conditions in Australia.

In September 2020, Kia Australia issued a recall on 2,465 units of the Seltos sold between 25 October 2019 and 25 August 2020. The affected units are to be fitted with an antitheft locking mechanism in the steering wheel column shaft to meet Australian design rules. The Seltos was the 25th-highest selling vehicle in Australia in 2020.

Other markets 
The SP2 model is also offered in the Philippines and Russia. CKD assembly of the SP2 Seltos commenced in Avtotor plant in Kaliningrad from April 2020.

Safety 

The SP2 Seltos received a five-star rating from Australasian New Car Assessment Program, and a four-star rating from the U.S. National Highway Traffic Safety Administration.

Engines

SP2i model 
SP2i is the internally designated codename for the Seltos model manufactured in India and exported mostly to emerging markets.

Visually, the SP2i Seltos can be identified from the SP2 Seltos by the hood line that ends by the grille that creates a seamless "clamshell" hood design, while for the SP2 Seltos, the hood line ends behind the Kia logo. The front end region is also slightly shorter and the rear bumper is flatter in design. The SP2i Seltos along with the Chinese KX3 also has a different interior dashboard design compared to the SP2 Seltos with a simpler HVAC vent design and an integrated infotainment screen housing.

The SP2i model is not offered with all-wheel drive in any markets.

India 
The Seltos is the first product of Kia India following its entry in the country. The crossover was unveiled in New Delhi on 20 June 2019. By the time of its launch on 22 August 2019, Kia had received more than 50,000 bookings for the Seltos. Later, the Seltos emerged as the best-selling SUV in the country by delivering 12,854 units in October 2019. As of 1 April 2020, the Seltos sales crossed the 80,000 mark in India.

In India, the Seltos is offered in two submodels, which are the Tech Line and GT Line. Three engine options are offered in India, consisting of two petrol engines and one diesel engine. The petrol engines are the 1.5-litre, naturally aspirated engine that makes  paired with six-speed manual transmission, six-speed iMT transmission and CVT, and a 1.4-liter Kappa turbo engine that produces  paired with six-speed manual transmission or a seven-speed dual-clutch transmission (DCT). The diesel engine is a 1.5-litre U-Line unit that produces  paired with six-speed manual transmission, six-speed iMT or six-speed torque-converter automatic.

In August 2021, a new sub-model named X-Line was introduced in India. The new X-Line consist only of cosmetic changes rather than mechanical changes. The trim is available in two engine options, 1.4-litre turbo petrol engine and the 1.5-litre CRDi diesel. Upgrades included 18-inch alloy wheels and piano black trim highlights.

Other markets 
The Indian-built Seltos is exported to several regions, which mostly are emerging markets, including South Africa, North Africa, Southeast Asia (except the Philippines), Latin America, the Middle East, and other South Asian markets. It is also assembled by kits in Vietnam starting from July 2020. The exported Seltos from India is available with a 1.6-litre petrol engine, which is not offered in the Indian domestic market.

It was updated for the Mexican market on 6 August 2021, incorporating the new Kia logo.

The Seltos was the best-selling SUV in Mexico in 2020 and 2021.

Safety 

The Indian-specification Seltos is equipped as standard with two frontal airbags, two front side thorax-protecting airbags (6 airbags made standard in July 2022), antilock brakes, electronic stability control (made standard in April 2022), all-wheel disc brakes, rear parking sensors and front seatbelt reminders. Head-protecting curtain airbags are available on higher trim levels, as are tyre pressure monitoring and blind spot detection.

Global NCAP crash-tested the Indian-market Kia Seltos in its basic safety specification (of the time) of two airbags and anti-lock brakes in 2020 (similar to Latin NCAP 2013). The car scored three stars out of five for adult occupant protection in a 64 km/h frontal offset impact. The Seltos did not score any points for dynamics for child occupants because Kia refused to nominate child seats for the test.

Body-in-white repair manuals confirm that the SP2i has different dimensions, shapes and parts from the SP2, and also show that hot-formed reinforcements that aid energy dissipation in the IIHS driver-side small overlap test, which are present in the SP2, are missing in the SP2i.

Engines

Kia KX3 (SP2c) 

In September 2019, the Seltos was unveiled at the Chengdu Motor Show as the second-generation Kia KX3. Coded internally as SP2c, the car debuted in the Chinese market in December 2019. The KX3 has a  wheelbase, longer than any other versions of the Seltos.

Awards 
U.S. News & World Report ranked the Kia Seltos at No. 4 on its list of Best Subcompact SUVs for 2022, giving it a score of 8.2 out of 10.

Sales

Global sales

Regional sales

References

External links 

 (India)

Seltos
Cars introduced in 2019
Crossover sport utility vehicles
Mini sport utility vehicles
Front-wheel-drive vehicles
2020s cars
All-wheel-drive vehicles
Global NCAP small off-road
Vehicles with CVT transmission